Anolis barbatus (western bearded anole) is a species of anole lizard from Western Cuba. It is one of six species called "false chameleons" that sometimes are recognized as their own genus Chamaeleolis or as the Cuban clade in Xiphosurus. These are all native to Cuba, fairly large for anoles, have robust heads, are dull gray-brown in color, have blunt teeth used for crushing snails and insects, which are their main diet. Unusually among anoles, these all lack the ability to autotomize their tails. Together with the similar (in appearance and microhabitat), but not closely related A. landestoyi of Hispaniola, they form a group known as the twig–giant ecomorph.

Like other anoles, these stealthy creatures also have toe pads much like those found in geckos. This allows them to jump run or hide on just about any surface. Studies have found that Anolis barbatus lizards spend a majority of their time stationary. They typically only move to feed, escape predators and display to other lizards for mating. Although generally slow-moving like chameleons to hide from the eyes of predators, western bearded anoles can be very quick creatures when it comes to feeding and running from predators if spotted.

See also
List of Anolis lizards

References

Anoles
Lizards of the Caribbean
Endemic fauna of Cuba
Reptiles of Cuba
Reptiles described in 1982
Taxa named by Orlando H. Garrido